John Francis Scanlon (11 January 1911 – 21 July 1972) was an Australian rules footballer who played for St Kilda in the Victorian Football League (VFL) during the 1930s.

Scanlon came to St Kilda from Iona and was played mostly as a half back flanker and back pocket. He captained-coached VFA club Coburg from 1937 to 1940 and was non playing coach in 1948. His son, Peter Scanlon, was a VFL/AFL Commissioner from 1985 until 1992.

External links

Jack Scanlon's playing statistics from The VFA Project

References

1911 births
1972 deaths
Australian rules footballers from Victoria (Australia)
Coburg Football Club coaches
Coburg Football Club players
St Kilda Football Club players
People from Cardinia